Francis Berkeley (born ca. 1583) was an English lawyer and politician who sat in the House of Commons between 1614 and 1624.

He matriculated at Brasenose College, Oxford on 16 February 1599, aged 15, and again on 14 July 1602 when he was awarded BA the next day. He was called to the bar at Lincoln's Inn in 1612. In 1614, he was elected Member of Parliament for Shrewsbury. He was re-elected MP for Shrewsbury in 1621 and in 1624.

References

1580s births
Year of death missing
Politicians from Shrewsbury
Alumni of Brasenose College, Oxford
Members of Lincoln's Inn
English MPs 1614
English MPs 1621–1622
English MPs 1624–1625